Willi Eichhorn (23 August 1908 – 25 May 1994) was a German rower who competed in the 1936 Summer Olympics.

In 1936 he won the gold medal with his partner Hugo Strauß in the coxless pairs competition for men, He was only 27 at the time. This was also his only time competing in the Olympics.
Germany also went on to win the most gold medals that year.

References

External links
 Willi Eichhorn's Olympic record
 Hugo Strauß's Olympic record

1908 births
1994 deaths
Olympic rowers of Germany
Rowers at the 1936 Summer Olympics
Olympic gold medalists for Germany
Olympic medalists in rowing
German male rowers
Medalists at the 1936 Summer Olympics